Oleksiy Pavlovych "Alexei" Mikhnov (born August 31, 1982) is a Ukrainian-Russian professional ice hockey left wing who is currently an unrestricted free agent. He most recently played with the Severstal Cherepovets of the Kontinental Hockey League (KHL).

Playing career
Mikhnov was selected in the first round of the 2000 NHL Entry Draft, 17th overall, by the Edmonton Oilers, and has only played in two NHL games, his first being a 5–2 win versus Phoenix.  He was scoreless and even in 4:21 of ice time. His brother Andrei Mikhnov was at one time also a National Hockey League prospect and played in the Ontario Hockey League.

Mikhnov spent four seasons in the Russian Super League, and was considered a power forward prospect. Despite being from Ukraine, Mikhnov (unlike his brother) plays internationally for Russia.

After being drafted in 2000, Mikhnov has been something of a mystery to Oilers fans. Even when he was drafted, he was considered an enigma, and when he first hit Edmonton in 2004, the Oilers' front office discovered that Mikhnov had poor eyesight, leading to the team buying him a pair of glasses.

Mikhnov was one of the more famous players impacted by the inability of the National Hockey League and the Russian ice hockey federation to come to an agreement on a transfer arrangement, a situation which more famously affected Pittsburgh Penguins prospect Evgeni Malkin. On June 20, 2006, according to his agent, Mikhnov gave his two weeks' notice which theoretically could get him out of his contract with Lokomotiv Yaroslavl, and by early September Mikhnov was skating in Edmonton, taking a spin on September 3 at the University of Alberta. To date, any legal action by Lokomotiv Yaroslavl to retain Mikhnov like that being used to try to keep Malkin has not reached the press, and on September 5, Mikhnov signed a one-year deal with the Oilers.

Career statistics

Regular season and playoffs

International

References

External links

 
Bio from Hockey's Future

1982 births
Atlant Moscow Oblast players
Avtomobilist Yekaterinburg players
HC Dynamo Moscow players
Living people
Edmonton Oilers draft picks
Edmonton Oilers players
Lokomotiv Yaroslavl players
Metallurg Magnitogorsk players
National Hockey League first-round draft picks
HC Neftekhimik Nizhnekamsk players
HC Sibir Novosibirsk players
Sportspeople from Kyiv
Russian ice hockey left wingers
Salavat Yulaev Ufa players
Severstal Cherepovets players
Ukrainian ice hockey left wingers
Wilkes-Barre/Scranton Penguins players